Tianjin People's Hospital (formerly Mackenzie Memorial Hospital and Tientsin Mission Hospital and Dispensary) is a hospital in Tianjin, China. Prior to the Chinese Revolution, it was known as Mackenzie Memorial Hospital. Olympian Eric Liddell was born there in 1902.

History 
Tianjin People's Hospital was originally founded as the Tientsin Mission Hospital and Dispensary by Dr. John Kenneth Mackenzie of the London Missionary Society in 1880. Following his death, Mackenzie was succeeded by Dr. Fred C. Roberts, who led the hospital from 1888 until his death in 1894.

References

Hospitals in Tianjin